The 1997 City of Imola motorcycle Grand Prix was the eighth round of the 1997 Grand Prix motorcycle racing season. It took place on 6 July 1997 at the Autodromo Enzo e Dino Ferrari.

500 cc classification

250 cc classification

125 cc classification

References

City of Imola motorcycle Grand Prix
City of Imola
City of Imola Motorcycle Grand Prix